Karkheh County is in Khuzestan province, Iran. The capital of the county is the city of Alvan. At the 2006 census, the region's population (as Shavur District of Shush County) was 62,617 in 9,841 households. The following census in 2011 counted 69,051 people in 15,291 households. At the 2016 census, the district's population was 70,071 in 18,263 households. Shavur District was separated from Shush County on 16 December 2019 to become Karkheh County.

Administrative divisions

The population history and structural changes of Karkheh County's administrative divisions (as Shavur District of Shush County) over three consecutive censuses are shown in the following table.

References

Counties of Khuzestan Province

fa:شهرستان کرخه